Ken Hyder (born 29 June 1946) is a Scottish jazz fusion drummer and percussionist born in Dundee, Scotland, perhaps best known for combining folk, ethnic and Celtic music with jazz.

Career
Hyder has worked with and recorded with many musicians, including Elton Dean, Chris Biscoe, Tim Hodgkinson, Paul Rogers, Maggie Nicols, Don Paterson and Frankie Armstrong.

He has also worked with Dick Gaughan, Vladimir Rezitsky, Phil Minton, the Scottish Lindsay L. Cooper, Sainkho Namtchylak, Jo'burg Hawk, Marcio Mattos, Jim Dvorak, John Edwards, Dave Webster, John Rangecroft, Radik Tyulyush, Julian Bahula, Lucky Ranku, Larry Stabbins, Harry Beckett, Art Themen, Gary Windo, Pete McPhail, Keith Tippett, Harry Miller, Nick Evans, Raymond Macdonald, Ntshuks Bonga, Hamish Henderson, Jon Dobie, and Lello Colombo.

Hyder has been playing and composing music for over 40 years. In that time he has produced more than three dozen albums of original material. He began playing jazz in Scotland before moving south to London where he played at the Little Theatre Club at Garrick Yard, St Martin's Lane - an avant garde haunt, run by John Stevens (1940–1994).

In 1970, Hyder formed Talisker, and went on to make six albums with this pioneering and proto-type Celtic jazz group. In the 1970s, he began moving away from jazz and into collaborations with musicians from different musical backgrounds, including Irish, South African and South American players. Later, he became interested in exploring spiritual aspects of music with spiritual practitioners like Tibetan and Japanese Buddhist monks, and Siberian shamans.

Scotland and Siberia are now the strongest influences in his current work.

Hyder's current projects include K-Space, with Tim Hodgkinson and Gendos Chamzyryn; Hoots and Roots with Scottish singer Maggie Nicols; RealTime with z'ev, Andy Knight and Scipio; Raz3 with Hodgkinson and Lu Edmonds; A revived Talisker, with Nicols and Raymond MacDonald, plus a duo with pianist Vladimir Miller.

Most of his recent releases are on Ad Hoc records, Ayler records and SLAM.

Hyder's e-book novel based on shamanism in Siberia - Black Sky, White Sky - has been published. His second novel - Hack Attack - about cyber crime and cyber terrorism is also available. His memoir, How to Know - Spirit Music - Crazy Wisdom, Shamanism and Trips to the Black Sky, is also available.

Discography

Talisker
Dreaming of Glenisla (1975, Virgin Records)
Land of Stone (1977, ECM)
The Last Battle (1978, View)
The White Light (1980, View)
Humanity (1986, Impetus Records)
The Big Team
Under the Influence (1984, Konnex Records)
Dave Brooks / Ken Hyder
Piping Hot (1985, Silly Boy Lemon Records)
Dick Gaughan / Ken Hyder
Fanfare For Tomorrow (1985, Impetus Records)
Tim Hodgkinson / Ken Hyder
Shams (1987, Impetus Records)
Burghan Interference: Shams (2000, Slam Records)
Hodgkinson / Ken Hyder / Ponomaryova
The Goose (1992, Woof Records)
Tomas Lynch
The Crux of the Catalogue (1993, Linecheck Records)
Vladimir Rezitsky
Golden Years of the Soviet New Jazz Vol 2 (1993, Leo Records)
Hot Sounds from the Arctic (1994, Leo Records)
Chanter
Roots Run Deep (1995, Twang Dynasty Records)
Bing Selfish
Binging It All Back Home (Out of Depression Records)
Tshisa!
Urban Ritual (1995, Slam Records)
Bardo State Orchestra
The Ultimate Gift (1995, Impetus Records)
Bardo State Orchestra with Tibetan monks from the Shechen monastery
Wheels Within Wheels (1996, Impetus Records)
Northern Lights
Stillness in the Solovki (1998, Long Arms Records)
Hyder with Nicols / Brooks
The Known is in the Stone (1998, Impetus Records)
K-Space
Bear Bones (2002, Slam Records)
Going Up (2004, Ad Hoc Records)
Infinity (2008, Ad Hoc Records)
Black Sky (2013, Setola Di Maiale Records)
Ken Hyder / Bret Hart
Duets - Volume One (2003, InstrumenTales Masterdisc Library, USA)
Ken Hyder / Vladimir Miller
Counting on Angels (2003, Slam Records)
The Dynamix
We See Us in the Next Future (2003, Konnex Records)
RealTime
In the Shaman's Pocket (2008, Ayler Records)
Hoots and Roots with Maggie Nicols
Life and Death (2009, Ayler Records)
 Ghost Time – z’ev, Andy Knight, Ken Hyder – Hinterzimmer Records
 Angel Ontalva and the Shamfonk Rhythm Section with Scipio mini-CD
 Talisker – with Paul Rogers, bass and Ted Emmett, trumpet 
 Black Sky – K-Space – Setola Di Maiale
 Cold Warm - with Vladimir Miller - Eastov Records
 Siberia Extreme - from a trio of singer Chyskyyrai, Tim Hodgkinson and Hyder.
 Spectrum - by La Dolce Visa, recorded in Sicily with Piero La Rocca.

References

External links
Ken Hyder's homepage

Ken Hyder biography at All About Jazz
All Shaman Services | Shaman Services in London

1946 births
Living people
Jazz fusion musicians
Free improvisation
Scottish jazz drummers
British male drummers
Musicians from Dundee
Writers from Dundee
British male jazz musicians